Crocidolomia is a genus of moths of the family Crambidae.

Species
Crocidolomia luteolalis Hampson, 1893
Crocidolomia pavonana (Fabricius, 1794)
Crocidolomia subhirsutalis Schaus, 1927
Crocidolomia suffusalis Hampson, 1891

References

  & , 2013: Review of the genus "Crocidolomia" Zeller, 1852 from China (Lepidoptera: Crambidae), Shilap Revista de Lepidopterologia, 41 (163): 357-364. Full article: 

Evergestinae